The pinewoods darter (Etheostoma mariae) is a species of freshwater ray-finned fish, a darter from the subfamily Etheostomatinae, part of the family Percidae, which also contains the perches, ruffes and pikeperches. It is endemic to the eastern United States where it is only known to occur in the  Little Peedee River system in the Carolinas. It inhabits creeks, preferring gravel riffles and vegetated areas with strong currents.

References

pinewoods darter
Pee Dee River
Freshwater fish of the United States
pinewoods darter
Taxonomy articles created by Polbot